Septempeda was a Roman town in Picenum, now in the Italian region Marche. It became today's San Severino Marche after the fall of the Roman Empire.

Geography
The original Roman town Septempeda is located in the province of Macerata. The town was situated on the left bank of the river Flosis (modern River Potenza), at some 40 km inland from the Adriatic coast and at the foot of the Apennines. During the early Middle Ages the name changed into San Severino Marche and the inhabitants moved to a more westerly location. The original urban site is now abandoned and mostly used as farmland.

History
Its ancient origins, going back to the 3rd century B.C with the Roman conquest of the Picenum area in 268 B.C., are proven by early soldiers family names on many Roman tombstones, such as the gentes Baebia, Calpurnia and Flavia, but it is probable that also the social organization of the Picenes hamlets and trade center from the neighbourhood converged in the Roman centre of Septempeda.

Between the 3rd and 2nd centuries B.C. the conciliabulum and the possible praefectura were built. Around the mid-first century BC the settlement must have received municipal status and turned into a real Roman town.
Inscriptions prove that Septempeda had a basilica and temples consecrated to Jupiter and Feronia (this latter outside of the wall)

After Goth's raids in 545 a.C. Septempeda was abandoned by its inhabitants who found a refuge in the safer top of Monte Nero, a few kilometers western and on the opposite (right) side of the River Potenza.

After the barbarian incursions, the remains of Severino, last bishop of Septempeda since 540 a.C. to his death in 545 a.C., were recovered and transported (23 April 590 a.C) to Monte Nero. A legend of the Longobard age, associated to the transfer of Severino, is believed to demonstrate the existence of a veneration for the Saint, which received a written confirmation only from a document of 944 by Eudo Bishop, about the building of a church in Castello qui dicitur ad Sancto Severinum. This testifies the existence of a new toponym in the place of Septempeda,  that was soon named Castellum Sancti Severini and then simply Sanseverino, as  nowadays: San Severino Marche.

Origins of name
The origin of the name has been subject of speculations. The number seven (Latin: septem) is recurrent in the ancient and medieval town: seven Roman arms width of Septempeda's walls, seven gates of the Sanseverino walls, the Fountain of Seven Taps in the Castle of Sanseverino, seventy-seven arches of the arcade facing the main square of Sanseverino, seven younger brothers of Severino Bishops' that were hurled in seven hills to suffer and become saints because of a malediction delivered by their mother, or seven hamlets that aggregated themselves to form Septempeda. None of these explanations has been confirmed, while the best tradition claims the Roman name of Septempeda to derive from the seven hills surrounding the town, in a proud appeal to the seven hills of the Eternal City.

Research
During the past centuries, many finds have been brought to light at the ancient site of Septempeda. Most important structural discoveries were done during the excavations, in the second half of the 20th century, of two city gates, a Roman bath house, a potter's quarter, and parts of Roman houses. The well-identified walls of the town encircle a higher, hilly area north of the Roman valley road and a lower area slightly sloping towards the Potenza river. Parts of the walls in opus quadratum and two gates have been excavated. Almost centrally located are large thermal installations consisting of a courtyard, a portico, a pool, a caldarium, and other rooms with heated flooring, of which many were originally paved with mosaics. To the west of city wall and north of the main road, an industrial quarter was unearthed with a cluster of kilns for the production of tiles and pottery. Directly outside the town wall, the main road was aligned by cemeteries with a rich array of funeral monuments revealing information about the town’s inhabitants.

Recent archaeological surveys undertaken since 2004 by the Potenza Valley Survey Project, a project of Ghent University directed by prof. Frank Vermeulen, have resulted in further aspects of the urbanism of the town. The surveys include intensive low-altitude aerial photography and geophysical surveys. The investigations resulted in a detailed map of the main elements of the whole town grid. It shows a series of streets parallel to the main central artery which acts as decumanus maximus of the small town. The layout of the town resembles a very irregular pentagonal plan and measures some 15 ha within the walls (intra muros). Along the main decumanus, which coincides with the modern valley road, the forum can be distinguished. It measures some 59 x 33 m and is surrounded by a series of public buildings and monuments.

The Remains
Of  the walls of the Roman city of Septempeda, located in locality "La Pieve", eastern of the present-day town, are still to be seen the  foundations and also the remains of the eastern and south-western gates and a thermal-like building, probably near the city forum.

Outside the town walls remains of a furnace for the production of pottery, a private domus with mosaics and cemetery areas with tombs from the 1st and 2nd centuries A.D. have been excavated.

The cathedral of Santa Maria in Septempeda was probably built in Late Roman times and there, according to tradition, Bishop Severino was buried and hidden to protect his remains from barbarians. Of original Romanesque style is the apse and the right hand nave. It was rebuilt in the 13th century in Gothic-Lombard style and displays some extant frescoes. It has presently been restored and can be visited, being located next to the ancient town walls.

It has presently been restored and can be visited, being located next to the ancient town walls.

See also

 Ancient Ostra
 Archaeological Park of Urbs Salvia
 Potentia (ancient city)
 Ricina
 Sentinum
 Suasa

References

Sources 
 A. Gubinelli, (1975) San Severino Marche, Guida Storica Artistica, EDC ed.
 M. Landolfi, (2003) Il Museo Civico Archeologico di San Severino Marche, San Severino Marche.
 F. Vermeulen  (2012), "Topografia e processi evolutivi delle città romane della valle del Potenza (Picenum)." In: de Marinis, G., Fabrini, G.M., Paci, G., Perna, R. & Silvestrini, M. (eds.), I processi formativi ed evolutivi della città in area adriatica,  BAR International Series S 2419, Oxford, pp. 331–344.

External links
 General Department for Archaeological Monuments in the Marches - Septempeda 
 Ghent University - Potenza Valley Survey Project

Roman towns and cities in Italy
Picenum
Roman sites of the Marche
Tourist attractions in le Marche
Archaeological sites in le Marche
San Severino Marche